Virtual Skipper 5 is the 5th installment of Nadeo's Virtual Skipper series for Windows. It is a series of sailing simulator games targeted at semi experienced sailors rather than normal gamers. This installment concentrates particularly on the 32nd America's cup held in Valencia Spain in 2007. The game allows the user to take the helm of a number of different classes of boat including. International America’s Cup Class, Melges 24, Offshore Racer, Trimaran, Open 60 and even more are available as add-ons from unofficial sources. Single player allows competitions in both match racing and fleet racing, while multi player allows the above two and team racing. The races take place around a number of different types of course in a number of different settings ranging from Valencia, to Sydney, to Rio and many more. The typical race course is a windward leeward course with a gate at the leeward end.

Other features of the game are full weather with waves and built in wind shifts to affect tactics and a nearly full set of International Sailing Federation rules. There is a tutorial mode which will teach any user how to sail the boats and how to play the game by the rules in order to use them to gain a tactical advantage, which is a large part of sailing.

Reception

References

External links
 Virtual Skipper Official site

2007 video games
Focus Entertainment games
Sailing simulators
Video games developed in France
Video games set in Spain
Windows games
Windows-only games